Syarhey Vyachaslavavich Lyavitski (born 27 May 1990) is a Belarusian professional footballer.

Career
Born in Grodno, Lyavitski began playing football in FC Neman Grodno's youth system. He made joined the senior team where he made his Belarusian Premier League debut in 2008.

On 16 January 2020, the BFF banned Lyavitski for 12 months for his involvement in the match fixing.

References

External links

1990 births
Living people
Belarusian footballers
Association football midfielders
FC Neman Grodno players
FC Slutsk players
FC Lida players
FC Smolevichi players